The Waggoner Ranch is a historic north Texas ranch located 13 miles south of Vernon, Texas. The land was used primarily to raise crops, beef cattle and horses as well as for oil production. It was notable for being the largest ranch within one fence in the United States. It was originally established in 1852 near Vernon, Texas, by Daniel Waggoner under the name of Dan Waggoner & Son; his son being William Thomas Waggoner. It was acquired by Stan Kroenke, who is married to Ann Walton (niece of Sam Walton), in February 2016.

Location
The ranch is located west of Wichita Falls, Texas, south of Vernon, near the Red River. Other towns nearby include Electra and Seymour. It is the second largest ranch in Texas (after the King Ranch), enclosing  of land. It spans six counties and is half as large as Rhode Island. Parts of it can be seen from highways U.S. 183
and 283.

History
The ranch was originally established in 1852 near Vernon, Texas, by Daniel Waggoner under the name of Dan Waggoner & Son; his son being William Thomas Waggoner, who was an infant at the time.  Ranching operations began with 230 head of longhorn cattle and some horses. From 1889 to 1903, they acquired land in Wichita County, Wilbarger County as well as Foard County, Knox County, Baylor County and Archer County. The ranch spanned more than a million acres of land.

After the death of Daniel Waggoner in 1902, his son W.T. Waggoner acquired more land. By 1903, he sold some of the land near China Creek to developers. Although it still spans six counties, it is primarily centered on Wichita County and Wilbarger County. W.T. Waggoner raised Quarter Horses on the ranch, including Poco Bueno, who was buried on the ranch. In 1902, W.T. Waggoner found oil while drilling for water.

By 1909, W.T. Waggoner divided the Waggoner Ranch into four subsections: one for himself (White Face); and three smaller 8,500 acre sub-ranches for his children: Zacaweista, Four Corners, and Santa Ros. However, in 1923, he changed his mind, and set up a Massachusetts trust. His children would elect a Board of Trustees, who would make decisions with him at the helm.

After W.T. Waggoner's death, his three children, Guy Waggoner, E. Paul Waggoner and Electra Waggoner each inherited a section of the ranch, although there was still a Board of Trustees. Guy Waggoner lived there with his wife Anne Burnett, the daughter of Samuel Burk Burnett and heiress of the 6666 Ranch from 1922 until their divorce. E. Paul Waggoner raised Quarter Horses on the ranch. Electra Waggoner mostly resided at Thistle Hill in Fort Worth, although her husband, Albert Buck Wharton, operated a livery yard and horse stables on the ranch.

When Guy Waggoner died in 1950, his sons sold their share of the estate to members of the family. Specifically, this went to Albert Buckman Wharton, Jr., also known as Buster Wharton, who was Electra Waggoner's son, and Electra Waggoner Biggs, who was E. Paul Waggoner's daughter. Buster raised polo ponies and established the El Ranchio Polo Club on the ranch. He once played there with polo champion Cecil Smith. Meanwhile, Electra Waggoner Biggs became a renowned sculptor.

In 1991, Electra Waggoner Biggs sued to be able to sell the ranch. Her second cousin, Albert Buckman Wharton III, also known as Bucky Wharton, who was Buster Wharton's son, appealed to stop the liquidation. After Electra Waggoner Biggs's death, her share was inherited by Electra Waggoner Biggs's daughter Helen Biggs and her husband, Gene Willingham.

The ranch has been surveyed by the United States Department of Agriculture for matters of preservation. Thirty cowboys, and about 120 people overall, are employed on the property. It has about 14,000 cows and bulls as well as 500 horses. It also includes 30,000 acres of arable land and about 1,100 producing oil wells. One of the lakes on the ranch provides water for the City of Wichita Falls.

In August 2014, the ranch was listed on the real estate market with an asking price of  million. It was ultimately sold in February 2016 to billionaire Stan Kroenke, the husband of Wal-Mart heiress Ann Walton Kroenke and current owner of the National Football League's Los Angeles Rams and the Premier League's Arsenal F.C.

References

External links
Official website

1852 establishments in Texas
Ranches in Texas
Wichita County, Texas
Wilbarger County, Texas
Polo clubs in the United States
Walton family
Companies established in 1852